George Stanley Crump (born July 22, 1959) is a former American football defensive end. He played for the New England Patriots in 1982.

References

1959 births
Living people
American football defensive ends
East Carolina Pirates football players
New England Patriots players